Rose of Santa Rosa is a 1947 American comedy film directed by Ray Nazarro and written by Barry Shipman. The film stars Patricia Barry, Eduardo Noriega, Fortunio Bonanova, Eduardo Ciannelli, Ann Codee, Rosita Marstini and Douglas Fowley. The film was released on December 25, 1947, by Columbia Pictures.

Plot

Cast          
Patricia Barry as Dolores de Garfias 
Eduardo Noriega as Ramón Ortega
Fortunio Bonanova as Don Manuel Ortega
Eduardo Ciannelli as Don José de Garfias
Ann Codee as Aunt Isabel
Rosita Marstini as Mamacita
Douglas Fowley as Larry Fish
Hoosier Hot Shots as Themselves
Aaron González as Orchestra Leader

References

External links
 

1947 films
1940s English-language films
American comedy films
1947 comedy films
Columbia Pictures films
Films directed by Ray Nazarro
American black-and-white films
1940s American films
English-language comedy films